The Goodnight House, at 201 S. Main St. in Franklin, Kentucky, was built in 1893.  It was listed on the National Register of Historic Places in 1977. Designed by the McDonald Brothers, it is Late Victorian in style. It has also been known as the Judge Isaac Herschel Goodnight & Mrs. Ella Hoy Goodnight House and was home of Isaac Herschel Goodnight, who served three terms in the United States House of Representatives from 1889 to 1895.  After that, he returned to his law practice in Franklin, and later became judge of Kentucky's 7th Circuit Court District.

The home is located on the southeast corner of S. Main St. and E. Madison St.  The next building to the south is the Goodnight Memorial Library.  Across E. Madison St. begins the National Register-listed Franklin Downtown Commercial District. 

The Goodnight House is used by the Franklin Simpson Chamber of Commerce.  In December 2017 the chamber held a Christmas Open House event at the house.

References

National Register of Historic Places in Simpson County, Kentucky
Houses on the National Register of Historic Places in Kentucky
Victorian architecture in Kentucky
1893 establishments in Kentucky
Houses completed in 1893
Houses in Simpson County, Kentucky